Toledo City Council is the governing body of the city of Toledo, Ohio since 1914.

Council meets bi-weekly at One Government Center in downtown Toledo.

The Council consists of 12 members, 6 by district and 6 at large.

The Council President is the presiding officer and is selected amongst the council members.

The Districts are geographic and boundaries were shifted in 2011 due to population changes.

The Mayor of Toledo is not a member of the council, but does have a vote on legislation where a council vote results in a tie.

Toledo Municipal Code
The powers of the members are governed the Toledo Municipal Code.

Current Council Members

 The current composition of district council is:

Central
 District 1: John Hobbs III
 District 4: Vanice S. Williams

Southwest
 District 2: Matt Cherry, President of Council - southwest

Southeast
 District 3: Theresa Gadus - southeast

Northwest
 District 5: Sam Melden

Northeast
 District 6: Theresa Morris

The At-Large Councilmen are:

Dr. Michele Grim
Nick A. Komives
Cerssandra McPherson
Katie Moline
Dr. Tiffany M. Preston Whitman
George Sarantou

Standing Committees

(As of September 2020)

 Budget Oversight Committee (Ludeman/Moline)
 Education, Recreation, & Employment Committee (Adams/Gadus)
 Finance & Debt Oversight Committee (Moline/Ludeman)
 Neighborhoods, Community Development & Health Committee (Adams/Gadus)
 Public Safety & Criminal Justice Reform Committee (Cherry/Hobbs III)
 Regional Growth, Development, & Small Business Enterprise Committee (Ludeman/Cherry)
 Streets, Public Services, Utilities (Melden/Cherry)
 Water Quality & Sustainability Committee (Komives/Gadus)
 Zoning & Planning Committee (Cherry/Moline)

Council Chambers

Councilmen and other civic officials (City clerk and Assistant Clerk) are seated with a desk in front for guests. A glass wall separates the council from seating for visitors.

References

External links
 City Council

Ohio city councils